Christoph Dieckmann (born January 7, 1976, in Bonn) is a male beach volleyball player from Germany. He claimed the gold medal at the 2006 European Championships in The Hague, Netherlands, partnering Julius Brink. He competed at the 2004 Summer Olympics in Athens, Greece. His twin brother Markus is also a professional beach volleyball player in the international circuit.

Playing partners
 Julius Brink
 Markus Dieckmann
 Andreas Scheuerpflug

Sponsors
 Swatch

References
 Christoph Dieckmann at Beach Volleyball Database

1976 births
Living people
German men's beach volleyball players
Olympic beach volleyball players of Germany
Beach volleyball players at the 2004 Summer Olympics
Beach volleyball players at the 2008 Summer Olympics
Twin sportspeople
German twins
Sportspeople from Bonn